The 2020 United States Senate election in Maine was held on November 3, 2020, to elect a member of the United States Senate to represent the State of Maine, concurrently with the 2020 U.S. presidential election, as well as other elections to the United States Senate, elections to the United States House of Representatives and various state and local elections. This was Maine's first election for its Class 2 seat to use its ranked choice voting system. Because the first round of the general election saw a majority (51%), the instant runoff tabulation of more than 800,000 ballots was not carried out.

Republican Senator Susan Collins was challenged by Democratic nominee Sara Gideon, the speaker of the Maine House of Representatives, as well as independent candidates Lisa Savage and Max Linn. Collins was considered one of the most vulnerable Republican senators due to her decreased polling numbers and perceived harm to her reputation but was reelected by an unexpectedly large 8.6% margin, with 51% of the vote to Gideon's 42.4%. Despite this, her 51% share of the vote was her worst performance since her first election in 1996 and was a 17-point drop from 2014. Maine was the only state to elect a senator of a different party than the winner of its presidential contest in the November 3 election, with Collins outperforming President Donald Trump, who lost the state to Democratic nominee Joe Biden by 9.1%.

Background 
Republican Senator Susan Collins, widely considered one of the two most liberal Republican U.S. senators (the other being Lisa Murkowski), ran for a fifth term. Collins had won each election to this seat by a greater victory margin than the one before it. Observers did not anticipate this election to continue that trend.

Collins was criticized for her decision to vote to confirm Brett Kavanaugh to the United States Supreme Court despite his anti-abortion stances (Collins describes herself as pro-choice) and allegations of sexual misconduct and abuse against him, though she gave a highly publicized speech on the Senate floor explaining her reasoning. She also faced criticism for her stance on the impeachment of President Donald Trump. Collins voted in favor of allowing witness testimony in the Senate trial, and was the first Republican to do so, and she voted to acquit Trump on both charges of abuse of power and obstruction of Congress. She said she voted to acquit because "impeachment of a president should be reserved for conduct that poses such a serious threat to our governmental institutions as to warrant the extreme step of immediate removal from office." She initially claimed that Trump "learned a pretty big lesson" from the impeachment, but later said that she thought he had not learned from it after all. She has also been criticized for running for third, fourth, and fifth Senate terms despite vowing to serve no more than two terms during her 1996 campaign, though she has explained this as a product of having learned the value of seniority in the Senate. The emphasis on seniority became a key theme of her campaign. Collins's campaign emphasized her efficiency as a legislator, her efforts to pass the Paycheck Protection Program and other aid for small businesses, and her growing seniority and influence in the Senate, in particular her potential chairwomanship of the Appropriations Committee.

The Democratic nominee, Speaker of the Maine House of Representatives Sara Gideon, supports criminal justice reforms, expansion of the Affordable Care Act, rejoining the Paris Climate Accord, and imposing universal background checks on gun sales to combat gun violence. In 2019, Gideon faced an election ethics complaint for accepting reimbursements for her political donations from her own PAC. Gideon apologized for the violation, reimbursed the federal government a total of $3,250, and closed the PAC. Gideon was also criticized for keeping the Maine House of Representatives adjourned for most of the year (neighboring New Hampshire had reconvened its sizably larger legislature by late spring) and for allegedly turning a blind eye to a legislative colleague accused of molesting underage girls until she was forced to acknowledge the scandal.

Lisa Savage, a longtime antiwar activist and schoolteacher from Solon, initially sought the Maine Green Independent Party nomination, but in late February, she announced her intention to instead qualify for the ballot as an independent due to Maine's restrictive ballot access measures. In April, Savage turned in more than 5,500 signatures to the Secretary of State's office and thus qualified for the general election ballot.

Max Linn, a financial planner and conservative activist from Bar Harbor, was a Trump supporter and former candidate of the Republican and Reform parties. In July 2020, he qualified for the ballot as an independent. Former Republican State Senator Mary Small challenged the signatures on his petition, but the Secretary of State found that he had enough and he was placed on the ballot. Later that month, he announced his intention to drop out of the race to support Collins. But days later, he decided not to drop out unless Collins agreed to a list of policies, which she did not.

Party primaries were initially scheduled to take place on June 9, but due to the COVID-19 pandemic and its impact on the state, Governor Janet Mills rescheduled them for July 14. Mills's executive order also expanded voters' ability to request absentee ballots, which could then be done up to and on election day. The primaries were conducted with ranked choice voting. Parties qualified to participate in the 2020 primary election were the Democratic Party, the Republican Party, and the Maine Green Independent Party.

Republican primary

Candidates

Nominee
Susan Collins, incumbent U.S. Senator

Eliminated in primary
 Amy Colter, law office manager (write-in candidate)

Withdrawn
 Derek Levasseur, police officer

Declined
Paul LePage, former governor of Maine (endorsed Collins)
 Max Linn, financial planner, Reform nominee for governor of Florida in 2006, Democratic candidate for Florida's 10th congressional district in 2008 and disqualified candidate for U.S. Senate in 2018 (qualified for the general election as Independent)
Bruce Poliquin, former U.S. Representative for Maine's 2nd congressional district and former Treasurer of Maine

Polling

with Susan Collins and Paul LePage

with Susan Collins and Shawn Moody

with Susan Collins and generic Republican if Collins supported impeaching Trump

with Susan Collins and Derek Levasseur if Collins supported impeaching Trump

with Susan Collins and generic Republican

Results

Democratic primary
On April 20, 2019, attorney and activist Bre Kidman became the first person to announce their candidacy for the Democratic nomination, making them the first ever U.S. Senate candidate who identifies as non-binary. On June 13, 2019, former Maine gubernatorial candidate Betsy Sweet declared her candidacy. Eleven days later, Maine House Speaker Sara Gideon announced her candidacy, receiving widespread media coverage. A number of other candidates announced their candidacies, including General Jon Treacy and former Google executive and political aide Ross LaJeunesse, who would have been the first openly gay man elected to the Senate. LaJeunesse and Treacy withdrew, with LaJeunesse endorsing Gideon. Two debates were held with all three candidates, while one hosted by WCSH was attended only by Sweet and Kidman.

Candidates

Nominee
Sara Gideon, Speaker of the Maine House of Representatives

Eliminated in primary
Bre Kidman, attorney, activist, and artist
Betsy Sweet, activist, former director of the Maine Women's Lobby, and candidate for Governor of Maine in 2018

Withdrawn
Michael Bunker, travel agent
Christine Gates
Ross LaJeunesse, former Head of International Relations at Google, former aide to George J. Mitchell, Ted Kennedy, Steve Westly and Arnold Schwarzenegger (endorsed Gideon)
Cathleen London, physician and member of the Maine Democratic Party State Committee
Jon Treacy, retired U.S. Air Force Major General

Declined
Shenna Bellows, state senator and nominee for U.S. Senate in 2014
Seth Berry, state representative (endorsed Gideon)
Emily Cain, executive director of EMILY's List, nominee for Maine's 2nd congressional district in 2014 and 2016, former state senator, and former state representative
Adam Cote, candidate for Maine's 1st congressional district in 2008 and candidate for governor of Maine in 2018
Matthew Dunlap, Maine Secretary of State and candidate for U.S. Senate in 2012
Jared Golden, incumbent U.S. Representative for Maine's 2nd congressional district and former state representative
James Howaniec, former mayor of Lewiston
Stephen King, author (endorsed Gideon)
Daniel Kleban, businessman
Janet Mills, Governor of Maine and former Attorney General of Maine
Chellie Pingree, incumbent U.S. Representative for Maine's 1st congressional district and nominee for the U.S. Senate in 2002
Hannah Pingree, former Speaker of the Maine House of Representatives (endorsed Gideon)
Susan Rice, former United States National Security Advisor and former United States Ambassador to the United Nations
Cecile Richards, former President of Planned Parenthood
Zak Ringelstein, schoolteacher and nominee for U.S. Senate in 2018 (endorsed Sweet)
Rosa Scarcelli, businesswoman and candidate for governor of Maine in 2010
Ethan Strimling, former mayor of Portland and candidate for Maine's 1st congressional district in 2008

Polling

Results

Other candidates

Green Independent Party
Two candidates declared their intentions to run for the Maine Green Independent Party's nomination, but one withdrew and the other left the party to become an independent. Lisa Savage left the party because of Maine's ballot access requirements; Savage needed 2,000 registered party members to sign a nomination petition to appear on the ballot as the Green Party candidate but could only gather them from January 1 until the March 15 deadline. The Green Party had roughly 41,000 members statewide, which was significantly fewer than the Democratic and Republican parties but nonetheless required the same number of signatures. No alternative party candidate for statewide office had been able to meet this requirement since Pat LaMarche did so in 2006 for Governor. Instead, Savage sought to appear as an independent candidate, which required 4,000 signatures, but they may be from any registered voter, not just party members and they could have been gathered until the June deadline.

Withdrawn 
 David Gibson, solar design specialist (endorsed Savage)
 Lisa Savage, school teacher (switched to independent)

Write-in candidates 
 Tiffany Bond, lawyer and candidate for Maine's 2nd congressional district in 2018
 Ian Kenton Engelman
 Douglas E. Fogg

Independents 

Eight Independents declared their candidacy for Senate in 2020, including one affiliated with the Libertarian Party of Maine, which lost ballot access after the 2018 elections. Two qualified for positions on the November ballot.

Declared 

 Max Linn, perennial candidate, financial planner, and disqualified Republican candidate for the 2018 United States Senate election in Maine
 Lisa Savage, peace activist and schoolteacher (switched from Green Independent candidacy)

Withdrawn 
Joshua Arnone, accounting clerk affiliated with the Libertarian Party of Maine
 Steven Golieb, Millinocket town councilor
 Leigh Hawes, truck driver
 Danielle VanHelsing, LGBTQ rights activist
 Linda Wooten, vocational educator and conservative activist

General election

Predictions

Debates 
The four candidates participated in two in-person debates on September 11 and September 29, both held without an audience. Collins at one point proposed holding 16 debates, one for every county in Maine, but such a schedule was not agreed upon.

Endorsements

Polling

Graphical summary

Aggregate polls

with Betsy Sweet

with Susan Rice

with generic Democrat

with generic Democrat if Collins supports impeaching Donald Trump

with generic Democrat if Collins opposes impeaching Donald Trump

with Generic Opponent

with Generic Republican and Generic Democrat

Results 
Like many Republican Senate candidates in 2020, Collins did much better on Election Day than pre-election polls predicted; nearly all of them predicted her defeat. Collins defeated Gideon in the general election with 51.0% of the first-place votes, precluding additional rounds of tabulation. Gideon conceded to Collins on November 4.

Counties that flipped from Republican to Democratic
 Cumberland (largest municipality: Portland)
 Knox (largest municipality: Rockland)

Analysis 
Gideon underperformed Biden by 10.6%, the second-worst underperformance by a Democratic Senate candidate in the country. Examples of this discrepancy include Wells, a coastal town in the state's liberal southwest corner, where Biden won by 14% and Collins by 6%.

During his presidency, Collins's stance on Trump waffled, as he did not share her moderate politics but had a strong base in Maine's sprawling, rural 2nd congressional district. Collins voted against the Affordable Care Act repeal, but for the GOP's 2017 tax bill and to acquit Trump in his first impeachment. She voted to confirm Trump's nominees Brett Kavanaugh and Neil Gorsuch to the Supreme Court but against the confirmation of Amy Coney Barrett just days before the 2020 election, citing disagreement with process.

See also
 2020 Maine elections

Notes
Partisan clients

Voter samples

References

Further reading

External links
 Elections & Voting division of the Maine Secretary of State
 
 
  (State affiliate of the U.S. League of Women Voters)
 

Official campaign websites
 Susan Collins (R) for Senate
 Sara Gideon (D) for Senate 
 Max Linn (I) for Senate 
 Lisa Savage (I) for Senate 

2020
Maine
United States Senate